Yang Jong-ok (born 9 March 1964) is a South Korean judoka. He competed in the men's middleweight event at the 1992 Summer Olympics.

References

1964 births
Living people
South Korean male judoka
Olympic judoka of South Korea
Judoka at the 1992 Summer Olympics
Place of birth missing (living people)